Brandywine Creek is a tributary of the Cuyahoga River that is partly contained in Cuyahoga Valley National Park in Ohio.

Watershed
The river runs into the Cuyahoga River in Sagamore Hills Township near the now-abandoned Jaite Paper Mill.  Discharge volume is extremely seasonal, usually a few cubic feet per second, and peaking at several hundred cubic feet per second under flood conditions.

The Brandywine Creek watershed begins in the northern portion of Hudson, and includes the cities of Hudson, Macedonia and Twinsburg, and the townships of Boston, Sagamore Hills, and Northfield Center.

Brandywine Falls

From there, wooden paths lead down to the waterfall. The falls can also be accessed via the Brandywine Gorge Trail, a 1.5 mile hiking trail.

Rock layers

The rock layers of the  Brandywine Falls can be read like a book. Each chapter covers millions of years, as ancient seas left behind sediments that were compressed by added layers. The rocks here at the base of the falls were formed more than 400 million years ago.

Brandywine Creek and the "bridal veil" cascades began about 10,000 years ago after the last glacial retreat. The falls have now exposed the harder, yellow-brown Berea sandstone looming over the softer, deep red Bedford Shale. Since sandstone is more resistant to erosion, the shale below is frequently undercut. As these layers wear away, the story of the earth continues to be revealed.

Village of Brandywine
Brandywine Falls was the site of the Village of Brandywine.

See also
List of rivers of Ohio

References

External links

Rivers of Ohio
Cuyahoga River
Rivers of Summit County, Ohio